Madeleine Riffaud (born 23 August 1924) is a French poet, journalist, war correspondent and previously a member of the French Resistance.

World War II 
Madeleine grew up in the Somme region, surrounded by memories of the First World War. She was 15 years old when war with Germany was declared. In May 1940, the Luftwaffe strafed a column of refugees from the Somme in which she was fleeing for the unoccupied South-West. Following this, she decided to move to Paris and fight against the Nazis.

She began operating for the French Forces of the Interior at the age of 18 under the codename "Rainer", participating in several operations against occupying Nazi forces and contributing to the capture of 80 Wehrmacht soldiers from an armoured German supply train. On July 23, 1944, at age 19, she became famous for the killing of a German officer, whom she shot dead in broad daylight on a bridge overlooking the river Seine.

Shortly afterwards, she was captured by a French collaborator, handed over to the Gestapo and taken to their HQ at Rue des Saussaies before being transferred to Fresnes Prison. Following her torture and a date being set for her execution, she was finally released in a prisoner exchange. She immediately returned to fight in the Resistance with the aim of freeing Paris from Nazi occupation. After the liberation of Paris, she and her comrades continued the fight against the Nazis until the end of the War.

Journalism 

After the war ended in 1945, she became a journalist for Ce Soir, a French newspaper run by Louis Aragon, and then reported on the Algerian War for the French newspaper L'Humanité. In 1946, she met with Ho Chi Minh in Paris and vowed to devote her life to Vietnam. She moved to South Vietnam, and lived with the Viet Cong resistance for 7 years, covering their fight during the Vietnam War. There, she published Au Nord Vietnam, écrit Sous Les Bombes and made a documentary film entitled Dans Le Maquis du Sud-Vietnam, documenting their methods of guerrilla warfare. She also fell in love with Vietnamese poet Nguyễn Đình Thi, but wasn't able to marry him due to the old law in Vietnam about not marrying foreigners.

Upon her return to France, she worked as a nursing assistant in a Paris hospital, where she wrote the best-seller Les Linges De La Nuit, and published an anthology of poetry, Cheval Rouge: Anthologie Poétique, 1939-1972.

Madeleine Riffaud was awarded the National Order of Merit (France) in Paris on February 26, 2013, for her contributions to France and the world. She received the Friendship Medal from Vietnam in August 2005.

Writing and poetry 

Riffaud wrote poetry throughout the war and during her career as a journalist. Pablo Picasso drew her portrait for the frontispiece of Le Poing Fermé (The Closed Fist), her collection of poems published in 1945.

Her autobiographical account of her time in the Resistance was published in 1994 entitled On L'appelait Rainer, referencing the nom de guerre that she adopted during that time. She has also starred in a number of documentaries about her life.

Publications 

 Le Poing Fermé (1945)
 Le Courage D'aimer (1949)
 Les Carnets de Charles Debarge, documents recueillis et commentés par Madeleine Riffaud (1951)
 Les Baguettes de Jade (1953)
 Le Chat si Extraordinaire (1958)
 Ce que j'ai vu à Bizerte (1961) 
 Merveille et Douleurs : l'Iran (1963)
 De votre Envoyée Spéciale... (1964)
 Dans Les Maquis "Vietcong" (1965)
 Au Nord-Vietnam : écrit sous les bombes (1967)
 Nguyễn Đinh Thi : Front du Ciel (Mãt trãn trên cao) (1968)
 Cheval Rouge : Anthologie Poétique, 1939–1972 (1973)
 Les Linges de la Nuit (1974)
 On L'appelait Rainer : 1939–1945 (1994) 
 La Folie du Jasmin : poèmes dans la nuit coloniale (2001)
 Bleuette (2004)

References 

French Resistance members
War correspondents of the Vietnam War
French women journalists
1924 births
Living people
Women in the Vietnam War
Women in World War II
Women war correspondents
French women poets
20th-century French women
French expatriates in Vietnam